Wheater is a surname. Notable people with the surname include:

Adam Wheater (born 1990), English cricketer
Charles Wheater (1860–1885), English cricketer
David Wheater (born 1987), English footballer
Joe Wheater (1918–2000s), British sport shooter
John Denby Wheater (1921–1985), British Great Train Robbery accomplice
John F. Wheater, English particle physicist

See also
Wheatear, a genus of passerine birds